Georges Danton (1759–1794) was a leading figure in the early stages of the French Revolution.

Danton may also refer to:

People
 Danton (name)

Places
 Danton Township, Richland County, North Dakota
 Danton Pinch, former village in Kent, England, demolished for the Channel Tunnel

Naval ships
 Danton-class battleship, in the French Navy
 French battleship Danton

Films
 Danton (1921 film), German film by Dimitri Buchowetzki
 Danton (1931 film), German film by Hans Behrendt
 Danton (1932 film), French film by André Roubaud
 Danton (1970 film), UK television film by John Howard Davies, starring Anthony Hopkins
 Danton (1983 film), French/Polish film starring Gérard Depardieu and Anne Alvaro, directed by Andrzej Wajda